"Don't Go Near the Water" is a song written by Chapin Hartford and Jim Foster, and recorded by American country music artist Sammy Kershaw.  It was released in January 1992 as the second single and title track from the album Don't Go Near the Water.  The song reached number 12 on the Billboard Hot Country Singles & Tracks chart.

Chart performance

Year-end charts

References

1991 songs
1992 singles
Sammy Kershaw songs
Song recordings produced by Buddy Cannon
Song recordings produced by Norro Wilson
Songs written by Chapin Hartford
Mercury Records singles